BK Saldus is a professional basketball club based in Saldus, Latvia playing in the Latvian Basketball League.

Since 2007 the club played in Latvian Basketball League second division, but in 2013 the club became the second division champions and received an invitation to participate in first division.

Roster

Season by season

References

External links
Official website 

Saldus
Basketball teams in Latvia